China has a history of female infanticide spanning 2,000 years. When Christian missionaries arrived in China in the late sixteenth century, they witnessed newborns being thrown into rivers or onto rubbish piles. In the seventeenth century Matteo Ricci documented that the practice occurred in several of China's provinces and said that the primary reason for the practice was poverty. The practice continued into the 19th century and declined precipitously during the Communist era, but has reemerged as an issue since the introduction of the one-child policy in the early 1980s. The 2020 census showed a male-to-female ratio of 105.07 for mainland China, a record low since the People's Republic of China began conducting censuses.

History

19th century 

During the 19th century the practice was widespread. Readings from Qing texts show a prevalence of the term ni nü (to drown girls), and drowning was the most common method used to kill female children. Other methods used were suffocation and starvation. Exposure to the elements was another method: the child would be placed in a basket which was then placed in a tree. Buddhist nunneries created "baby towers" for people to leave a child. In 1845 in the province of Jiangxi, a missionary wrote that these children survived for up to two days while exposed to the elements, and that those passing by would ignore the screaming child. Missionary David Abeel reported in 1844 that between one fourth and one third of all female children were killed at birth or soon after.

In 1878 French Jesuit missionary, Gabriel Palatre, collated documents from 13 provinces and the Annales de la Sainte-Enfance (Annals of the Holy Childhood), also found evidence of infanticide in Shanxi and Sichuan. According to the information collected by Palatre the practice was more widespread in the southeastern provinces and  the Lower Yangzi River region.

20th century 

In 1930, Rou Shi, a noted member of the May Fourth Movement, wrote the short story A Slave-Mother. In it he portrayed the extreme poverty in rural communities that was a direct cause of female infanticide.

A white paper published by the Chinese government in 1980 stated that the practice of female infanticide was a "feudalistic evil". The state officially considers the practice a carryover from feudal times, not a result of the state's one-child policy. According to Jing-Bao Nie, it would be "inconceivable" to believe there is "no link" between the state's family planning policies and female infanticide.

On September 25, 1980, in an "open letter", the Politburo of the Chinese Communist Party requested that members of the party, and those in the Communist Youth League, lead by example and have only one child. From the beginning of the one-child policy, there were concerns that it would lead to an imbalance in the sex ratio. Early in the 1980s, senior officials became increasingly concerned with reports of abandonment and female infanticide by parents desperate for a son. In 1984, the government attempted to address the issue by adjusting the one-child policy. Couples whose first child is a girl are allowed to have a second child.

Current situation 

Many Chinese couples desire to have sons because they provide support and security to their aging parents later in life. Conversely, a daughter is expected to leave her parents upon marriage to join and care for her husband's family (parents-in-law). In rural households, which as of 2014 constitute almost half the Chinese population, males are additionally valuable for performing agricultural work and manual labor.

A 2005 intercensus survey demonstrated pronounced differences in sex ratio across provinces, ranging from 1.04 in Tibet to 1.43 in Jiangxi. Banister (2004), in her literature review on China's shortage of girls, suggested that there has been a resurgence in the prevalence of female infanticide following the introduction of the one-child policy. On the other hand, many researchers have argued that female infanticide is rare in China today, especially since the government has outlawed the practice. Zeng and colleagues (1993), for example, contended that at least half of the nation's gender imbalance arises from the underreporting of female births.

According to the Geneva Centre for the Democratic Control of Armed Forces (DCAF), the demographic shortfall of female babies who have died for gender related issues is in the same range as the 191 million estimated dead accounting for all conflicts in the twentieth century. In 2012, the documentary It's a Girl: The Three Deadliest Words in the World was released. It focused on female infanticide in India and China.

According to China's 2020 census (the Seventh National Population Census of the People's Republic of China), the gender ratio of mainland China has improved, with the male-to-female ratio reaching a new record low of 105.07. This is the most balanced gender ratio since the PRC began conducting a census in 1953.

See also 
 It's a Girl: The Three Deadliest Words in the World
 List of administrative divisions in China by infant mortality
 List of Chinese administrative divisions by gender ratio
 Missing women of China

Footnotes

References

Bibliography

Further reading 
 Female infanticide by Websters

Infanticide
Sexism in China
Violence against women in China
Crime in China
Female infanticide
Childhood in China